Prithviraj Kapoor (born Prithvinath Kapoor; 3 November 1906 – 29 May 1972) was an Indian actor who is also considered to be one of the founding figures of Hindi cinema. He was associated with IPTA as one of its founding members and established the Prithvi Theatres in 1944 as a travelling theatre company based in Bombay.

He was the patriarch of the Kapoor family of Hindi films, four generations of which, beginning with him, have played active roles in the Hindi film industry, with the youngest generation still active in Bollywood. His father, Basheshwar Nath Kapoor, also played a short role in his movie Awara. The Government of India honoured him with the Padma Bhushan in 1969 and the Dadasaheb Phalke Award in 1971 for his contributions towards Indian cinema.

Early life and education 
Prithviraj Kapoor was born on 3 November 1906 in Samundri, Punjab, India, into a Punjabi Hindu Dhai Ghar Khatri family of the Kapoor gotra. His father, Basheshwarnath Kapoor, was a police officer in the Indian Imperial Police, posted in the city of Peshawar. His grandfather, Keshavmal Kapoor, was a Tehsildar in Samundri near Lyallpur. Kapoor was the eldest of eight siblings, five boys (including Prithviraj and Trilok Kapoor, also an actor) and three girls. Film producer Surinder Kapoor, father of actors and producers Anil Kapoor, Boney Kapoor and Sanjay Kapoor, was a cousin of Prithviraj Kapoor.

Kapoor's childhood was largely spent in Lyallpur, Punjab, where his grandparents and extended family lived. Later, his father was transferred to Peshawar, North West Frontier Province, and after some years, the family moved there, while retaining house and property in Lyallpur. Kapoor studied initially at Khalsa College in Lyallpur, and later at Edwardes College in Peshawar.

Career 

Kapoor began his acting career in the theatres of Lyallpur and Peshawar. In 1928, he moved to Bombay City, Bombay Presidency, with a loan from an aunt. There he joined the Imperial Films Company and started acting in minor roles in movies. In 1928, he made his acting debut as an extra in his first film, Be Dhari Talwar. He went on to earn a lead role in his third film, titled Cinema Girl, which released in 1929.

After featuring in nine silent films, including Be Dhari Talwar, Cinema Girl, Sher-e-Arab and Prince Vijaykumar, Kapoor did a supporting role in India's first film talkie, Alam Ara (1931). His performance in Vidyapati (1937) was much appreciated. His best-known performance is perhaps as Alexander the Great in Sohrab Modi's Sikandar (1941). He also joined the Grant Anderson Theater Company, an English theatrical company that remained in Bombay for a year. Through all these years, Kapoor remained devoted to the theatre and performed on stage regularly. He developed a reputation as a very fine and versatile actor on both stage and screen.

Prithvi Theatres 

By 1944, Kapoor had the wherewithal and standing to found his own theatre group, Prithvi Theatres, whose première performance was Kalidasa's Abhijñānaśākuntalam in 1942. His eldest son, Raj Kapoor, by 1946, had struck out on his own; the films he produced had been successful and this was also an enabling factor. Prithviraj invested in Prithvi Theatres, which staged memorable productions across India. The plays were highly influential and inspired young people to participate in the Indian independence movement and the Quit India Movement.
 In over 16 years of existence, the theatre staged some 2,662 performances. Prithviraj starred as the lead actor in every single show. One of his popular plays was called Pathan (1947), which was performed on stage nearly 600 times in Mumbai. It opened on 13 April 1947, and is a story of a Muslim and his Hindu friend.

By the late 1950s, it was clear that the era of the travelling theatre had been irreversibly supplanted by the cinema and it was no longer financially feasible for a troupe of up to 80 people to travel the country for four to six months at a time along with their props and equipment and living in hotels and campsites. The financial returns, through ticket sales and the rapidly diminishing largesse of patrons from the erstwhile princely class of India, was not enough to support such an effort. Many of the fine actors and technicians that Prithvi Theatres nurtured had found their way to the movies. Indeed, this was the case with all of Prithviraj's own sons. As Kapoor progressed into his 50s, he gradually ceased theatre activities and accepted occasional offers from film-makers, including his own sons. He appeared with his son Raj in the 1951 film Awara as a stern judge who had thrown his own wife out of his house. Later, under his son, Shashi Kapoor, and daughter in law  Jennifer Kendal, Prithvi Theatre merged with the Indian Shakespeare theatre company, "Shakespeareana", and the company got a permanent home, with the inauguration of the Prithvi Theatre in Mumbai on 5 November 1978.

Postage stamp 

In 1996, the Golden Jubilee year of the founding of Prithvi Theatre, India Post, issued a special two Rupee commemorative postage stamp. It featured the logo of the theatre, the dates 1945–1995, and an image of Kapoor. The first day cover, (stamped 15-1-95), showed an illustration of a performance of a travelling theatre in progress, on a stage that seems fit for a travelling theatre, as Prithvi theatre was for sixteen years, until 1960. On the occasion of 100 years of the Indian cinema, another postage stamp, bearing his likeness, was released by India Post on 3 May 2013.

Later years 
His filmography of this period includes Mughal-e-Azam (1960), where he gave his most memorable performance as the Mughal emperor Akbar, Harishchandra Taramati (1963) in which he played the lead role, an unforgettable performance as Porus in Sikandar-e-Azam (1965), and the stentorian grandfather in Kal Aaj Aur Kal (1971), in which he appeared with his son Raj Kapoor and grandson Randhir Kapoor.

Kapoor starred in the legendary religious Punjabi film Nanak Nam Jahaz Hai (1969), a film so revered in Punjab that there were lines many kilometres long to purchase tickets.

He also starred in the Punjabi films Nanak Dukhiya Sub Sansar (1970) and Mele Mittran De (1972).

He also acted in the Kannada movie Sakshatkara (1971), directed by Kannada director Puttanna Kanagal. He acted as Rajkumar's father in that movie.

Awards and honours 

In 1954, he was awarded the Sangeet Natak Akademi Fellowship, and in 1969, the Padma Bhushan by the Government of India. He remained Nominated Rajya Sabha Member for eight years.

He was posthumously awarded the Dadasaheb Phalke Award for the year 1971. He was the third recipient of that award, the highest accolade in Indian cinema.

Awards 
 1954: Sangeet Natak Akademi Fellowship by the Sangeet Natak Akademi
 1956: Sangeet Natak Akademi Award by the Sangeet Natak Akademi
 1969: Padma Bhushan by the Government of India
 1972: Dadasaheb Phalke Award (Posthumous) for the year 1971, for his immense contribution to Indian theatre and cinema

Personal life 
Kapoor was aged 17 when he was married to the 15-year-old Ramsarni Mehra, a lady of his own community and similar background, in a match arranged by their parents in the usual Indian way. The marriage was harmonious and conventional and lasted all their lives. In fact, the wedding had been held even earlier, a few years prior to this, and it was the gauna ceremony (farewell) which was celebrated when Ramsarni reached the age of 15 and became old enough to leave her parents and reside with her husband and in-laws. Ramsarni's brother, Jugal Kishore Mehra, would later enter films.

The couple's eldest child, Raj Kapoor, was born the following year in Peshawar, North West Frontier Province, on 14 December 1924; making Prithviraj a father at age 18. By the time Prithviraj moved to Bombay City, Bombay Presidency in 1927, the couple were the parents of three children. In 1930, Ramsarni joined Prithviraj in Bombay. The following year, while she was pregnant for the fourth time, two of their sons died in the space of one terrible week. One of their children, Devinder (called Devi), died of double-pneumonia, while the other child, Ravinder (called Binder or Bindie), died of poisoning in a freak incident when he swallowed rat-poison pills strewn in the garden.

The couple went on to have three more children: sons Shamsher Raj (Shammi) and Balbir Raj (Shashi) (who were to become famous actors and filmmakers in their own right), and daughter, Urmila Sial.

After his retirement, Prithviraj settled in a cottage called Prithvi Jhonpra near Juhu Beach, West Bombay. The property was on lease, which was bought by Shashi Kapoor, and later converted into a small, experimental theatre, the Prithvi Theatre. Both Prithviraj and Ramsarni had cancer and died 16 days apart. Prithviraj died on 29 May 1972 and Ramsarni passed away on 14 June 1972.

A Samadhi (memorial) of Raj Kapoor at their family farm "Rajbaugh", which means the "king of gardens", also houses Privthiraj Kapoor and his wife's memorial. Rajbaugh lies on the banks of Mula-Mutha River in Loni Kalbhor village 30 km east of Pune in Maharshtra. Kapoor family sold part of 125 acres Rajbaugh to MIT World Peace University (MIT WPU) which built and houses the memorial for the Kapoor family on its campus. It has 7 pagodas and a viewing gallery which displays the Kapoor family photographs. Raj Kapoor shot many of his films at this farm, including Satyam Shivam Sundaram, Mera Naam Joker, Bobby, and Prem Rog among others. Kapoor's family bungalow inside the farm has been preserved; the popular song "Hum Tum Ek Kamre Mein Band Ho" was shot inside this bungalow.

Selected filmography 

Do Dhari Talwar (1928)
Cinema Girl (1929)
Alam Ara (1931)
Draupadi (1931)Rajrani Meera (1933)Daku Mansoor (1934)Seeta (1934)Manzil (1936)
Milap (1937)
President (1937)
Vidyapati (1937)
Dushman (1939)
Chingari (1940)
Sajani (1940)
Raj Nartaki (1941)
Sikandar (1941)
Ek Raat (1942)
Ishara (1943)
Maharathi Karna (1944)
Dahej (1950)
Awaara (1951)
Anand Math (1952)
Chhatrapati Shivaji (1953)
 Pardesi (1957)
    Jagga Daku (1959)
 Mughal-e-Azam (1960)
 Harishchandra Taramati (1963)
 Rustom Sohrab (1963)
 Pyaar Kiya To Darna Kya (1963)
 Gazal (1964)
 Jahan Ara (1964)
 Rajkumar (1964)
 Zindagi (1964)
 Janwar (1965)
 Sikandar-e-Azam (1965)
 Khakaan (1965)
Love And Murder (1966)
 Daku Mangal Singh (1966)
 Shankar Khan (1966)
 Lal Bangla (1966)
 Yeh Raat Phir Na Aayegi (1966)
 Teen Bahuraniyan (1968)
 Nanak Naam Jahaz Hai (1969) (punjabi movie)
   Nanak Dukhiya Sub Sansar(1970) (Punjabi movie)
 Heer Raanjha (1970)
 Sakshatkara (1971) (Kannada)
 Kal Aaj Aur Kal (1971)
    Mele Mitran De (1972) Punjabi movie

 Further reading 
 Shashi Kapoor presents the Prithviwallahs'', by Shashi Kapoor, Deepa Gahlot, Prithvi Theatre (Mumbai, India). Roli Books, 2004. .

References

External links 

 
 
 Prithviraj, My father by Shamsherraj (Shammi) Kapoor

1906 births
1972 deaths
Punjabi Hindus
Indian male film actors
Indian male silent film actors
Indian male stage actors
Indian theatre directors
Indian People's Theatre Association people
Indian theatre managers and producers
Nominated members of the Rajya Sabha
Recipients of the Sangeet Natak Akademi Fellowship
Dadasaheb Phalke Award recipients
Recipients of the Padma Bhushan in arts
Hindi theatre
People from Faisalabad
20th-century Indian male actors
Prithviraj
Edwardes College alumni
Deaths from cancer in India